North Wales is the northern geographic region of Wales.

North Wales may also refer to:
 North Wales (Senedd electoral region), an electoral region of the Senedd (the Welsh Parliament) covering the North Wales coast.
 North Wales (European Parliament constituency), a former European Parliament constituency in Wales, between 1979-1999.
 North Wales, Pennsylvania, a suburb of Philadelphia, Pennsylvania, US
 North Wales (SEPTA station)

See also
 Gwynedd in the High Middle Ages
 New North Wales, Canada